The 1924 California Golden Bears football team was an American football team that represented the University of California, Berkeley in the Pacific Coast Conference (PCC) during the 1924 college football season. In their ninth year under head coach Andy Smith, the team compiled an 8–0–2 record (2–0–2 against PCC opponents), finished in second place in the PCC, and outscored its opponents by a combined total of 162 to 51.

Schedule

References

California
California Golden Bears football seasons
College football undefeated seasons
California Golden Bears football